The following is a timeline of the history of the city of Newport News, Virginia, United States.

19th century

 1862 – Naval Battle of Hampton Roads fought near Newport News village during the American Civil War.
 1880 – Old Dominion Land Company created by Collis Potter Huntington "to secure railway right-of-ways" on the Virginia Peninsula.
 1882 – Chesapeake and Ohio Railway begins operating.
 1883 – Hotel Warwick in business.
 1884 – Courthouse built.
 1886 – Chesapeake Dry Dock and Construction Company (later Newport News Shipbuilding and Dry Dock Co.) in business.
 1888 – Warwick County seat moves temporarily to Newport News from Denbigh.
 1889
 Newport News Light & Water Company in business.
 YMCA branch organized.
 1890
 Citizens Railway (Hampton-Newport News) begins operating.
 Horse-drawn Newport News Street Railway begins operating (approximate date).
 Population: 4,449.
 1891
 Courthouse built.
 First National Bank established.
 1894 – Adath Jeshurun synagogue built.
 1896
 January 16: City of Newport News incorporated, independent of Warwick County.
 Daily Press newspaper begins publication.
 Fire station built.
 1897 – First Baptist Church rebuilt.
 1900 – Population: 19,635.

20th century

 1901 – Star and Times-Herald newspapers begin publication.
 1904 – U.S. Custom House and Post Office built.
 1906 – Buxton Hospital established.
 1908
 Virginia State School for Colored Deaf and Blind Children opens.
 Chamber of Commerce formed.
 1910 – Olympic Theatre in business.
 1914 – Curtis Flying Field begins operating near Newport News.
 1917
 U.S. military Hampton Roads Port of Embarkation headquartered in Newport News during World War I.
 U.S. War Department Camp Alexander, Camp Hill, and Camp Stuart begin operating in vicinity of Newport News (approximate date).
 1918
 Jefferson Avenue Park (housing) established.
 U.S. military Camp Eustis (later Fort Eustis) begins operating near Newport News.
 Influenza outbreak.
 1919
 Newport News Shipbuilding and Dry Dock Company's Apprentice School established.
 Hilton Village (housing) built.
 Newport News Victory Arch erected.
 1920
 Council–manager form of government begins.
 Philip W. Hiden becomes mayor.
 1923 – WNEW radio begins broadcasting.
 1924 – Collis P. Huntington High School built.
 1927 – Kecoughtan becomes part of Newport News.
 1928
 James River Bridge opens.
 WGH (AM) radio begins broadcasting.
 1929 – Newport News Public Library built.
 1930
 Dodge Boat & Plane Co. in business.
 Mariners' Museum founded.
 1932 – James River Country Club founded.
 1933
 August 23: Hurricane.
 U.S. military aircraft carrier  launched at Newport News Shipbuilding and Drydock Company.
 1937 – Aberdeen Gardens (housing) built in nearby Hampton for shipworkers.
 1942 – U.S. military Hampton Roads Port of Embarkation headquartered in Newport News during World War II.
 1945 – Citizens Rapid Transit Co. founded.
 1946 – Electric streetcar stops operating.
 1947 – WTID radio begins broadcasting.
 1949 – Patrick Henry Airport begins operating.
 1950 – Population: 42,358.
 1952
 Anchor Drive-In cinema in business.
 Warwick County becomes the City of Warwick.
 1954 – October 15: Hurricane Hazel occurs.
 1956 – Newmarket Shopping Center in business.
 1958 – July 1: City of Warwick consolidated into city of Newport News.
 1959 – U.S. Army Transportation Museum established in nearby U.S. military Fort Eustis.
 1960
 Interstate 64 highway construction completed.
 Population: 113,662.
 1961 – Christopher Newport College opens.
 1967 – Todd Stadium opens.
 1968 – Afro-American Historical and Genealogical Society Hampton Roads branch formed.
 1971 – September: School "court-ordered busing" begins.
 1972 – City Hall built.
 1975 – Newmarket North Mall in business.
 1979 – September: Hurricane David occurs.
 1980 – Population: 144,903.
 1981 – Amtrak Newport News station built.
 1982 – Virginia Port Authority's affiliate Virginia International Terminals begins operating the Newport News Marine Terminal.
 1984 – U.S. Continuous Electron Beam Accelerator Facility (later Jefferson Lab) established.
 1987 – Patrick Henry Mall in business.
 1992
 Monitor–Merrimac Memorial Bridge–Tunnel opens.
 Newport News/Williamsburg International Airport new terminal built.
 1993 – Bobby Scott becomes U.S. representative for Virginia's 3rd congressional district.
 1996
 July: Hurricane Bertha occurs. 
 Warwick SRO housing created.
 City website online (approximate date).

21st century

 2005 – Ferguson Center for the Arts opens.
 2010
 McKinley L. Price becomes mayor.
 U.S. military Joint Base Langley–Eustis in operation near city.
 Warwick County Historical Society active.
 Population: 180,719 in city; 1,676,822 in Virginia Beach-Norfolk-Newport News, VA-NC Metropolitan Statistical Area.

See also
 History of Newport News, Virginia
 List of mayors of Newport News, Virginia
 National Register of Historic Places listings in Newport News, Virginia
 History of Hampton Roads area
 Timelines of other cities in Virginia: Alexandria, Hampton, Lynchburg, Norfolk, Portsmouth, Richmond, Roanoke, Virginia Beach

References

Bibliography

 
 1917 ed.
 
 
 
 
  
 Annie Lash Jester. Newport News, Virginia 1607–1960. Richmond: Whittet & Shepperson, 1961.
 Van Hawkings. Hampton/Newport News: A Pictorial History. Virginia Beach: The Donning Company/Publishers, Inc, 1975.
 
 
 John V. Quarstein and Parke S. Rouse Jr. Newport News: A Centennial History. Newport News: City of Newport News, 1996
  (Timeline)

External links

   (Publications about Newport News)
 
 Items related to Newport News, various dates (via Digital Public Library of America)

 
Newport News